This is a list of television series that have been adapted from theatrical films, either as a straight adaptation (i.e. a "remake"), or as a sequel or prequel.

Follow-ups and prequels

These television series follow the events of the original theatrical film, so they can be considered sequels of it, or take place before the events of the original theatrical film and are set within the same universe.

Adaptations

These television series are adaptations of the original theatrical film, but are neither prequels nor sequels:

10 Things I Hate About You (based on the film of the same title)
101 Dalmatian Street (reboot series based on the 1961 film One Hundred and One Dalmatians)
101 Dalmatians: The Series (based on both the 1961 animated film and the 1996 live-action adaptation)
12 Monkeys (based on the film of the same title)
12 O'Clock High (from the 1949 film of the same title)
9 to 5 (from the film of the same title)
18 Again (based on 17 Again)
The 7D (based on the characters from the 1937 Disney film Snow White and the Seven Dwarfs)
Adam's Rib (from the film of the same title)
The Adventures of Rin Tin Tin (based on the silent film franchise starring the dog of the same name)
Alice (from Alice Doesn't Live Here Anymore)
Alice's Wonderland Bakery (based on the world from the 1951 Disney film Alice in Wonderland)
All Hail King Julien (from Madagascar)
Anna and the King (from The King and I)
The Asphalt Jungle (inspired by the 1950 film of the same title)
Attack of the Killer Tomatoes: The Animated Series (animated; actually based on Return of the Killer Tomatoes, the sequel to Attack of the Killer Tomatoes)
Baby Boom (based on the film of the same title)
Baby Talk (loosely based on the film Look Who's Talking)
The Bad News Bears (based on the 1976 film of the same title)
Bajo el mismo cielo (based on the film of the same title)
Bad Teacher (based on the film of the same title)
Bagdad Cafe (based on the 1987 film of the same title)
BeastMaster (syndicated television series loosely based on the film The Beastmaster)
Beethoven (animated; from the film of the same title)
Beetlejuice (animated; from the film of the same title)
The Big Easy (based on the 1987 film of the same title)
Bill & Ted's Excellent Adventures (1990) (animated; based on the 1989 film of the same title)
Bill & Ted's Excellent Adventures (1992) (live-action; based on the 1989 film of the same title)
Blood+ (animated; loosely based upon the anime film Blood: The Last Vampire)
Bob & Carol & Ted & Alice (based on the film of the same title)
Born Free (from the 1966 film of the same title)
Broken Arrow (based on the 1947 novel Blood Brother by Elliott Arnold and the film of the same title)
Bus Stop (based upon the 1955 William Inge play of the same title and the 1956 film version of the play)
Bustin' Loose (based on the film of the same title)
The Client (based on the film of the same title)
The Client List (based on the film of the same title)
Clueless (loose remake of the film of the same title, especially the series' first season)
Conan the Adventurer (syndicated television series that is a loose adaptation of the 1982 film Conan the Barbarian)
The Cowboys (based on the 1972 film of the same title)
Crash (based on the film of the same title)
The Crow: Stairway to Heaven (from The Crow)
Curious George (adaptation of the 1941 book and the 2006 film of the same title)
Daktari (based on the 1965 film Clarence, the Cross-Eyed Lion)
Damien (based on The Omen film series)
Dangerous Minds (based on the film of the same title)
Day of the Dead (based on the film of the same title)
The Dead Zone (adaptation of the 1983 film of the same title)
Dirty Dancing (based on the film of the same title)
Dixon of Dock Green (from The Blue Lamp)
Doctor Dolittle (based upon the book series by Hugh Lofting and the 1967 film of the same title)
Doctor in the House (from the film series of the same title)
Dr. Kildare (from the film series of the same title)
Dorothy and the Wizard of Oz (based on the 1939 film The Wizard of Oz and the 1900 novel The Wonderful Wizard of Oz by L. Frank Baum)
Dominion (loose adaptation of the 2010 film Legion)
Down and Out in Beverly Hills (based on the film of the same name)
The Dukes of Hazzard (based on the 1975 film Moonrunners)
Executive Suite (from the film of the same title)
F/X: The Series (from F/X)
Fame (from the film of the same title)
Fantastic Voyage (from the film of the same title)
The Farmer's Daughter (based on the film of the same title)
Fast Times (from Fast Times at Ridgemont High)
La Femme Nikita (1997; from the film La Femme Nikita, also called Nikita; see also Nikita TV series)
Ferris Bueller (loose adaptation of the 1986 film Ferris Bueller's Day Off)
Five Fingers (loose adaptation of the 1952 film 5 Fingers)
Flipper (from the 1963 film of the same title); see also the 1995 series
Foul Play (from the film of the same title)
The Four Seasons (1984 TV series based on the 1981 film of the same title)
Freddy's Nightmares (based on the character from the A Nightmare on Elm Street movie series, this was anthology series in the style of Tales from the Crypt – Freddie's involvement was often limited to introducing the story)
Free Willy (animated; from the film of the same title)
Freebie and the Bean (from the film of the same title)
Friday Night Lights (loose adaptation of the film of the same name)
The Front Page (based upon the 1928 play and 1931 film version of the same title)
The Gene Autry Show (from the Gene Autry film series and the earlier radio series Gene Autry's Melody Ranch)
The Ghost & Mrs. Muir (from the film of the same title)
Gidget (sometimes seen as a sequel to the 1959 film of the same name, despite numerous discontinuities in plot, time frame, and other detailsso perhaps best viewed as an adaptation of the film and its source novel, Gidget, the Little Girl with Big Ideas)
The Girlfriend Experience (loose adaptation of the film of the same title)
Godzilla (animated, from the Godzilla film series)
Godzilla Island (from the Godzilla film series)
Going My Way (from the film of the same title)
 The Greatest Show on Earth (from the film of the same title)
Gun Shy (based on the 1975 film The Apple Dumpling Gang)
Gung Ho (from the film of the same title)
Hannibal (based on the Thomas Harris novels and film adaptations)
Harry and the Hendersons (from the film of the same title)
Heathers (based on the film of the same title)Herbie, the Love Bug (from the Herbie film series)Hondo (based on the 1953 film of the same title)House Calls (from the film of the same title)Hotel (from the 1967 film of the same title)How the West Was Won (from the 1962 film of the same title)How to Marry a Millionaire (from the film of the same title)In the Heat of the Night (very loose adaptation of the film of the same title – the setting was changed from the 1960s to the 1980s)Irma Vep (based on the film of the same title)Jake and the Never Land Pirates (based on the world from the 1953 Disney film Peter Pan)James Bond Jr. (based on the James Bond film series and the 1967 novel The Adventures of James Bond Junior 003½ by R. D. Mascott)Journey to the Center of the Earth (based upon the original 1864 novel by Jules Verne and the 1959 film of the same title)Jumanji (from the film of the same title)The King Kong Show (based on the 1933 film King Kong)Kings Row (based upon the 1942 film of the same title and the Henry Bellamann novel)Kong: King of the Apes (based on the 1933 film King Kong)
Lassie (1954) (based on the character from the 1940 novel Lassie Come-Home by Eric Knight and the reowned film franchise about the eponymous dog)
Lassie (1997) (based on the Lassie film franchise)
Lassie (2014) (animated series based on the Lassie film franchise)Lassie's Rescue Rangers (animated series based on the Lassie film franchise)Legend of the Three Caballeros (based on the 1944 film The Three Caballeros)Lethal Weapon (from the film franchise of the same title)The Life and Times of Grizzly Adams (from the 1974 film of the same title)The Life of Riley (based upon the 1940s radio show, The Life of Riley, and the 1949 film of the same name)Little Shop (animated; from the 1960 film The Little Shop of Horrors)Logan's Run (from the film of the same title)The Long, Hot Summer (from the 1958 film The Long, Hot Summer)Madagascar: A Little Wild (from Madagascar)Madigan (loosely based on the film of the same title – aired as part of The NBC Wednesday Mystery Movie programs)Mama (from the 1948 film I Remember Mama)The Magnificent Seven (from the film of the same title)Manchester Prep (loose adaptation of the movie Cruel Intentions – three episodes were produced for the planned TV series Manchester Prep, but the series was cancelled and the episodes never aired on TV; instead the episodes were edited together and released as the movie Cruel Intentions 2, though it was not a sequel to the original movie)M*A*S*H (from the film of the same title)Margie (from the film of the same title)McCloud (based upon the film Coogan's Bluff)Michael Shayne (based upon the 1940 film Michael Shayne: Private Detective and the 1940 novel The Private Practice of Michael Shayne by Brett Halliday)Mister Roberts (based upon the best selling novel, 1948 play, and the 1955 film of the same name)Mr. Lucky (from the 1943 film of the same title)Mr. Smith Goes to Washington (based upon the 1939 film of the same name) My Friend Flicka (based upon the 1944 film and Mary O'Hara's novel of the same name)My Friends Tigger & Pooh (from The Many Adventures of Winnie the Pooh)My Sister Eileen (based upon the 1942 and 1955 films of the same title)Naked City (from the 1948 film The Naked City)National Velvet (from the 1944 film and Enid Bagnold's novel of the same name)The Net (from the film of the same title)The Neverending Story (animated series based on the film of the same title)The New Adventures of Winnie the Pooh (from The Many Adventures of Winnie the Pooh)The New Lassie (based on the Lassie film franchise)Nikita (2010; from the film Nikita, also called La Femme Nikita; see also La Femme Nikita TV series)No Time for Sergeants (based upon the 1954 novel by Mac Hyman and the 1958 film of the same title)Operation Petticoat (from the film of the same title)The Outsiders (based upon the 1967 novel by S. E. Hinton and the 1983 film version of the same title)The Paper Chase (from the film of the same title)Paper Moon (from the film of the same title)
Parenthood (1990) (based on the 1989 film of the same title)
Parenthood (2010) (based on the 1989 film of the same title)Party Girl (from the film of the same title)The Penguins of Madagascar (from Madagascar)
The Pink Panther (1993) (animated; based on The Pink Panther film series)Pink Panther and Sons (animated; based on The Pink Panther film series)Please Don't Eat the Daisies (from the film of the same title)Poltergeist: The Legacy (loosely based on the film franchise of the same title)Private Benjamin (from the film of the same title)The Purge (from the film franchise of the same title)Room for One More (based upon the 1952 film of the same name)The Roy Rogers Show (from the Roy Rogers film series)Rush Hour (from film franchise of the same title)School of Rock (from the film of the same title)Scream (from the film of the same title)Serpico (based on the film of the same title)Seven Brides for Seven Brothers (based on the film of the same title)Shaft (based upon the 1971 film of the same title)Shane (based upon the 1953 film of the same title)Sing Me a Story with Belle (based on the 1991 film Beauty and the Beast)Spirit Riding Free (based on the film Spirit: Stallion of the Cimarron)Spy Kids: Mission Critical (animated; based on the Spy Kids film series)Stir Crazy (based on the film of the same title)Sugarfoot (faithfully based on The Boy from Oklahoma)Tales from the Neverending Story (based on the film of the same title)Tammy (based upon the Tammy film series)
Teen Wolf (1986) (animated series based on the film of the same title)
Teen Wolf (2011) (live-action series minimally based on the film of the same title)The Thin Man (from the film of the same title)The Third Man (from the film of the same title)Time After Time (loosely based on the film and novel of the same title)Timecop (from the film of the same title)Timon & Pumbaa (based on the eponymous characters from the Disney film The Lion King)Topper (from the film of the same title)Total Recall 2070 (from the 1990 film Total Recall)Toxic Crusaders (based on The Toxic Avenger film franchise)Transporter: The Series (based on the Transporter film series)Voyage to the Bottom of the Sea (based on the film of the same title – the plot of the film was used as the basis of an episode of the series called "The Sky's on Fire")Wangan Midnight (anime adapted from the live-action series of the same name, in turn adapted from the manga)What We Do in the Shadows (based on the New Zealand film of the same title)Weird Science (from the film of the same title)Westworld (based the film of the same title)What's Happening!! (from Cooley High; the setting was moved from 1960s Chicago to 1970s Los Angeles)Working Girl'' (from the film of the same title)

See also
List of films based on television programs
Lists of television programs

References

Other sources
'Parenthood' And 23 More TV Shows Based On Movies
THE 10 WORST TV SHOWS BASED ON MOVIES
12 Of The Worst TV Shows Based On Movies
The 10 Worst TV Shows Inspired By Movies
Worst of the Worst: TV Shows Based On Movies
Best and Worst TV Shows Based on Movies
Five Best TV Series Based on Movies
10 Movies You Had No Idea Were Turned Into TV Shows (VIDEO)
9 Stinkers That Prove ‘Romancing The Stone: The Series’ Is A Bad Idea
10 worst TV shows based on movies
Can TV Shows Based on Movies Actually Be Good?
7 TV Shows Made from Movies
Is it better to be a TV series based on a movie or vice versa?
The Daily Beast: Bad TV Shows Adapted From Movies
Big Picture, Small Screen: 20 Movie-Based TV Shows From Worst to Best
‘Bad Teacher’ can look back at some movie-to-TV shows for inspiration — or a warning
8 Terrible TV Shows Based On Iconic Films Of The Past

List
Television programs based on films, List of
Films, List of television programs based on
T